The 2016–17 WNBL season is the 37th season of competition since its establishment in 1981. The regular season begins on October 7, 2016 when the Sydney Uni Flames host the Perth Lynx and is scheduled to conclude on February 19, 2017. Townsville Fire were the two-time defending champions, but they were defeated by the Sydney Uni Flames in the Semifinals. The Flames would go on to take home their fourth WNBL title, their first in sixteen years, after defeating the Dandenong Rangers in the final.

Player Movement

Team standings

Finals

Statistics

Individual statistic leaders

Individual game highs

Awards

Player of the Week Award

Team of the Week Award

Player & Coach of the Month Awards

Postseason Awards

Team Captains & Coaches

References

 
2016–17 in Australian basketball
Australia
Basketball
Basketball